Ernst Oberaigner (born 5 November 1932) is an Austrian alpine skier. He competed in the men's slalom at the 1960 Winter Olympics.

References

1932 births
Living people
Austrian male alpine skiers
Olympic alpine skiers of Austria
Alpine skiers at the 1960 Winter Olympics
Sportspeople from Salzburg